was a Japanese actress. She appeared in about 90 films between 1927 and 1991.

Selected filmography

  (1930)
  (1930)
  (1931)
  (1931-1932, part 1, 2) - Ayako Kirihara
  (1932) - Mitsuko, reporter
  (1932)
  (1933)
  (1933)
 A Woman Crying in Spring (1933) - Oaki
  (1933)
  (1933)
  (1934)
  (1934) - Fumiko
  (1935) - Yoshiko
  (1935)
  (1936) - Namie - stepdaughter
  (1938) - Mrs. Hayakawa
 Sincerity (1939) - Mrs. Asada
  (1942) - Sakai's wife
  (1942) - Sakai's Wife
  (1942)
  (1943) - O-yuki
  (1947) - Fujie Sugawara
  (1947) - Masa Hirobe
 Apostasy (1948) - Inoko's wife
  (1949) - Proprietress of the bar
  (1949) - Yasuko
  (1949) - Kuniko
  (1950) - Sudô's mother
  (1950, part 1, 2)
  (1951) - Mihiko
  (1951)
  (1951) - Sakiko Kodama
  (1952)
  (1952)
  (1952) - Doctor
  (1953) - Itsuko, Natsuko's aunt
  (1953) - Setsuko's mother
  (1953) - Madame
  (1953) - Masako
  (1953)
  (1954) - Shizuko Matsuo
  (1955) - Aoshima's mother
 A Girl Isn't Allowed to Love (1955) - Junko Matsushima
 Princess Yang Kwei-Fei (1955) - Chengfei (uncredited)
  (1955) - Motoko
  (1955) - Landlady
  (1955) - Sei Komatsu
  (1955) - Satoko Kitahara
  (1955)
 Ruri no kishi (1956) - Uta, Chiho's grand mother
  (1956) - Mineko Iizuka
  (1956) - Teruko Hisamoto
  (1956) - Atsuko
  (1956)
  (1957)
  (1957)
  (1957) - Kikyoko Shirakawa
  (1958) - Takako Sakô
  (1958) - Toshiko
  (1959)
  (1959) - Naoko, Shinobu's mother
  (1959)
  (1959) - Shizuko, Nogi's wife
 A False Student (1960) - Hikoichi's mother
  (1961)
  (1962) - Tsuya
  (1962)
  (1962) - Hatsu Shiozaki
  (1962) - Atsuko Yamagata
 Zatoichi the Fugitive (1963) - Maki
  (1963) - Setsu Noro
  (1964) - Fujiko Arima
  (1964) - Matsuyo Hidaka
 Zatoichi and the Doomed Man (1965) - Shimazo's wife
  (1966) - Kikuno Miyoshi
  (1966) - Yasu
  (1966)
 Lost Spring (1967) - Taza Murakoshi
  (1967) - Sumie
 The Snow Woman (1968) - Soyo
  (1970)
  (1978)
  (1980) - Fusae Kawazu (Yûko's mother)
 Station (1981) - Ryosuke's mother
  (1983)
 A Promise (1986) - Tatsu, Ryôsaku's wife
 Rhapsody in August (1991) - Kane

References

External links

1905 births
1993 deaths
Japanese film actresses
Actresses from Tokyo
20th-century Japanese actresses